Don Randall may refer to:

 Don Randall (Fender) (1917–2008), manager at Fender Musical Instruments Corporation
 Don Randall (politician) (1953–2015), Australian politician